Zheng Hun Qi Shi may refer to:

The Personals (1998 film), a Taiwanese film directed by Chen Kuo-fu
Mr. Right Wanted, a 2014 Taiwanese TV series directed by Lien Yi-chi